John Cockburn may refer to:

 John Cockburn of Ormiston (died 1583), supporter of the Scottish Reformation
 John Cockburn (died 1623), Scottish landowner and lawyer
 Colonel John Cockburn (c1620–c1680), 17th-century Scottish officer
 John Cockburn (theologian) (1652–1729)
 John Cockburn (Scottish politician) (died 1758)
 John Cockburn (Australian politician) (1850–1929)
 Jack Cockburn (1911–1990), Australian Rules footballer
 John Cockburn (test pilot) (1937–2017)

See also
John Coburn (disambiguation)